Berrylands is a residential neighbourhood in Surbiton, London, originally forming part of the Municipal Borough of Surbiton, and since 1965 part of the Royal Borough of Kingston upon Thames. Nearby places include Surbiton, New Malden, Old Malden, Tolworth and Chessington. Berrylands railway station is 24 minutes from London Waterloo by train.

History
Berrylands is a settlement of Anglo-Saxon origin that is close to the Thames. Berrylands originally formed part of the Municipal Borough of Surbiton, however in 1965 it was incorporated as part of the Royal Borough of Kingston upon Thames.
Most of the present housing development took place in the 1930s on the former Berrylands Farm.

Old Maps from the 1860s show the western Banks of the Hogsmill River and everything around them to be mostly empty apart from a few small trails and farm buildings with no evidence of real human settlement. In addition the area had absolutely no annotations of the word Berrylands to mark the area. In the late 19th and early 20th century the only prominent structure was the Regent House. It was the main building of Berrylands Farm.

The land was developed around the early 1930s and was complemented in 1933 with the opening of Berrylands Station. The Construction of all the homes in one go was the reason why they all look similar. The Regent House was demolished to make way for new housing, with the street where the building used to stand appropriately being named Regent Road and in some gardens, parts of the regent house's foundation are still visible.

The Surbiton Lagoon lido opened in 1934, but later closed in 1980, and then demolished at the end of the decade.
This area was subsequently transformed into a park now owned and managed by Kingston Council, known as Berrylands Park, with a small area to the south developed into housing, creating Meldone Close. By Meldone close a small car park was also constructed.

Etymology
Berrylands is a place-name that misleadingly suggests "land where berries grow". The name was recorded as Berilendes in 1126, and as Berulind in 1148 (wrongly suggesting Old English  "lime-tree" as the second element), and more recently as Barrilands in 1378, which shows the true origin as being from Old English . The name has occasionally been mistaken as meaning the bottom of the hill as opposed to the hill itself.

In a sense, the name corresponds to the modern English "Hill Farm", a common name for farms (and some new residences) across the United Kingdom.

Housing, shops and transport
There are four separate parades of shops, these are Alexandra Drive, Berrylands Road, Chiltern Drive and a smaller parade along Surbiton Hill Park. Chiltern Drive is at the centre of Berrylands, and houses over 22 businesses as well as the Berrylands public house, the Berrylands, known locally as 'The Berry'. The shops were built in the 1930s, and currently consist of a newsagents, doctors surgery, hairdressers, beauty salon, CCTV shop, barbers, coffee shop, printer and bookshop, as well as the Berrylands railway station.

The neighbourhood is primarily residential. It houses a large commuter population using Transport for London travel routes, including two bus routes, the K2 and 665, and the Berrylands, Surbiton or Tolworth links to London Waterloo.

The majority of houses in the neighbourhood were built in the 1930s and have features typically found in housing stock of the inter-war period. Although most houses are semi-detached there are also many detached properties and a small number of flats. On the fork of Grand Avenue and Elmbridge Avenue, there is a cluster of Modernist Art Deco houses, built as part of the Parkside estate in 1934 (developer Bell). There's also a little variety in architecture with small flat blocks on Surbiton Hill Park just north of the Railway Station.

Geography
Berrylands Station is the closest station to the sports ground of the London School of Economics and Political Science, which is in New Malden.  There is a large water treatment plant on the opposite side of the railway. There are two large parks in Berrylands Fishponds and Alexandra Park. Additionally nearby there is Green Lane park which is officially located within New Malden however most locals consider it to be within Berrylands.

Rivers 
Berrylands is atop a hill and so in the corner there are streams for water to flow down towards. The Hogsmill River marks much of the border between Berrylands and New Malden. There's also it's small tributary, a manmade brook which runs through the nature reserve, the site of the former Surbiton Lagoon and through Alexandra Park before leaving the neighbourhood.

Hills 
The Small Tributary of the Hogsmill river forges a valley where the Nature Reserve and Berrylands park also known as the former site of the Surbiton Lagoon. There's a small hill up east which rises reaching a peak within the housing areas before dipping backdown at the border with New Malden when it reaches the Hogsmill.

Nearby Places

Nature reserves

Raeburn open Space 

In 2017 The Environment Trust acquired a grant for £168,000 from Thames Water, to support a three-year community project enhancing the river habitat, creating wetland habitat, and improving the undermanaged woodland. In July 2018 a footbridge was opened to create a nature trail into previously inaccessible corners of the nature reserve. The Small River running through the nature reserves had some changes done to it, there were blocks of dirt placed in corners of the river to make it meander more and the weirs were removed. This was done to allow the fish within the river further down stream to be able to freely swim across the whole river.

The nature reserve had existed prior to 2017 but it was just a small park, with the river and some trees. Additionally there were some pathways on either side of the river bank but the only bridge was at the edge of the nature reserve at Stirling Walk. Also the Berrylands Scout Camp was situated at the edge of the nature reserve by the bridge and the scouts often used the field in that nature reserve for games. Adjacent to Raeburn open space was Berrylands Park, the former site of the Surbiton Lagoon.

Rose Walk Nature Reserve 
There's another small Nature reserve just south of the railway line at the corner of Raeburn Avenue and Surbiton Hill Park called Rose Walk Nature Reserve. It had no large investment and is more of just a small green area where people can walk their dogs and be around nature. It's only fault being it's directly south of the South Western Main line which generates a lot of noise.

Education

There are a two main schools in Berrylands, these being Christ Church Primary School and Grand Avenue Primary School. Grand Avenue according to official boundaries is within Tolworth however is widely recognised alongside all the housing around it to be a part of Berrylands and most students of the school reside there.

Sport 
The Surbiton Racket and Fitness club on Berrylands was established in 1881 - the Club was founded and was known as the Berrylands Lawn Tennis Club. There were 200 members and 11 grass courts. Directly Adjacent to the Grass courts are a variety of clay courts often used by Christ Church Primary School directly south of it. Also on the other side of the grass courts there's a building which contains various squash courts which are also used occasionally by the nearby school. In Grand Avenue Primary school there's a swimming pool which on top of serving both schools in Berrylands, also does private lessons.

Berrylands Festival
Each year the local scout group organises a summer festival opposite their scout hut on the site of the old Surbiton Lagoon, now known by Kingston Council as Berrylands Park.

References

Areas of London
Districts of the Royal Borough of Kingston upon Thames
London School of Economics